Inspector Gadget: Gadget's Crazy Maze is a puzzle video game based on the television show of the same name.

Plot
According to the story of Gadget's Crazy Maze, Inspector Gadget's mysterious nemesis is up to no good. This time, the M.A.D leader Dr. Claw has been creating mind-control crystals on his secret moon base, then tossing them down to Earth. If the crystals lay dormant for a short amount of time, they will activate, taking control of the consciousness of the whole world. To make sure no one disturbs them, Dr. Claw has spread them all around four different areas and inserted his vile henchmen to protect them.

External links
 

Video games based on Inspector Gadget
2001 video games
Ubisoft games
PlayStation (console) games
PlayStation (console)-only games
Detective video games
Video games about police officers
Video games developed in Germany
Puzzle video games
Single-player video games